The 2003 Continental Basketball Association All-Star Game was the 37th All-Star Game organised by CBA since its inception in 1949 and the first after 2000. It was held at the 7,500 seat Sioux Falls Arena in Sioux Falls, South Dakota on March 22, 2003. The National Conference defeated the American Conference 140-125 and Versile Shaw	was named the Most Valuable Player.

The 2008 ABA All-Star Game events

CBA Long Distance Shootout
Malik Dixon of Dakota Wizards was the winner beating Puerto Rican Larry Ayuso of Grand Rapids Hoops in the final.

CBA Fan-Jam
Bryant Notree of the Gary Steelheads won the slam-dunk competition beating Cory Hightower of the Great Lakes Storm in the final.

The Game
MVP Versile Shaw scored 29 points, picking up 7 rebounds, Fred Vinson had 24 pts while Tyson Wheeler had 14 assist for the National Conference. Albert White scored 28, Cory Hightower 27, Bryant Notree had 21 points and 9 rebounds and Fred Vinson 24 points for the winners.

All-Star Teams

Rosters

See also

Continental Basketball Association

References

Continental Basketball Association
2002–03 in American basketball